Declan Brooks (born 10 July 1996) is a British Olympic bronze medalist winning cyclist who competes in Freestyle BMX.

Brooks was born in Portsmouth and attended Cams Hill School and would practise at the Southsea skate park. He won a bronze medal at the European BMX Championships in Valmiera,  and a silver in the freestyle World Cup in 2019, and achieved a tenth-place finish at the 2019 UCI Urban Cycling World Championships, in Chengdu.

In June 2021 he was confirmed on the Great Britain team for the delayed 2020 Summer Games in Tokyo. On 1 August he won the bronze medal in the BMX Freestyle.

Personal life
In 2017, Brooks appeared as a contestant on the ITV dating gameshow Take Me Out.

Contest history
2019 UCI Urban Cycling World Championships - Park: 3rd
2019 UEC BMX Freestyle Park European Championships - 3rd

References

1996 births
Living people
British male cyclists
BMX riders
Olympic cyclists of Great Britain
Cyclists at the 2020 Summer Olympics
Medalists at the 2020 Summer Olympics
Olympic bronze medallists for Great Britain
Olympic medalists in cycling
English Olympic medallists
Sportspeople from Portsmouth
21st-century British people